Gympl  is a Czech comedy film directed by Tomáš Vorel. It was released in 2007.

Cast
 Tomáš Vorel Jr. as Petr Kocourek
 Jiří Mádl as Michal Kolman
 Eva Holubová as Headmistress Mirka
 Tomáš Matonoha as Class master Tomáš
 Lenka Jurošková as Klára Krumbachová
 Martina Procházková as Pavla Malirova
 Zuzana Bydžovská as Petr's mother
 Jiří Schmitzer as Czech teacher Karel
 Milan Šteindler as Physics teacher Milan
 Martin Zbrozek as Gym master
 Tomáš Hanák as Pavla's father
 Tomáš Vorel as Janitor
 Filip Vorel as Jindra
 Tomáš Vaněk as Martin
 Kamila Kikinčuková as Monika
 Daniel Sidon as Punker

Production
It was extremely difficult for the then 16-year-old Lenka Jurošková to undress in front of the camera. "When director Vorel called me for the role, it was one of my happiest moments. A great opportunity, even with scenes that weren't easy for me," she admitted.

References

External links
 

2007 films
2007 comedy films
Czech Lion Awards winners (films)
Czech comedy films
2000s Czech-language films
2000s Czech films
Czech teen films
High school films